M. maritima may refer to:
 Malcolmia maritima, the Virginia stock, a popular annual garden plant species
 Muilla maritima, the sea muilla and common muilla, a flowering plant species native to California

Synonyms
 Matricaria maritima, a synonym for Tripleurospermum maritimum, a plant species

See also
 Maritima (disambiguation)